Sad-e Vaqas (also Romanized as Sa‘d-e Vaqāş; also known as Fīrūzān, Goosheh Sa‘d Vaghas, Gūsheh Sa‘d Vaqqās, Gūsheh-ye Sa‘d-e Vaqāş, Gūsheh-ye Sa‘d-e Vaqqāş, Salgās, and Sulgās) is a village in Tariq ol Eslam Rural District, in the Central District of Nahavand County, Hamadan Province, Iran. At the 2006 census, its population was 727, in 171 families.

References 

Populated places in Nahavand County